Joseph Paul Barnabé Perrot (18 January 1921 – 22 June 2005) was a French Roman Catholic bishop in Mali.

Barnabé Perrot was born in France and was ordained to the priesthood in 1949. He served as the ecclesiastical superior from 1962 to 1964 of the mission of San and then served as the  bishop of the Roman Catholic Diocese of San, Mali from 1964 until 1987.

Notes

1921 births
2005 deaths
French Roman Catholic bishops in Africa
French expatriates in Mali
Roman Catholic bishops of San